Iachim Sergheevici Grosul (name also rendered as Yakim Grosul) (born 21 September 1912 Caragaș village, Slobozia District – died 28 September 1976, Chișinău) was a Moldovan scientist, and the first president of the Academy of Science of the Moldavian SSR in the Soviet Union (1961-1976).

Biography 
He was born in the village of Caragaş, Slobozia county. In 1937, he graduated from the Pedagogic Institute in Tiraspol. After this, he worked at the Institute as lecturer in history. He joined the Communist Party in 1939. In 1940 he became dean of the History Department. From 1947, he was vice director, and from 1954, he was president of the Moldavian section of the USSR Academy of Sciences. In 1961, he was elected as the first president of the new Academy of Science of the Moldavian Soviet Socialist Republic. He was a good organiser, scientist and historian. Grosul developed and edited the Enciclopedia Republici Sovietice Socialiste Moldoveneşti, an eight-volume encyclopedia published between 1964 and 1981. He is noted for his book on the economic development of Bessarabia under Russian rule in the 19th century. However, his works relating to history, were many times censured, a common practice in the marxist dogmatic Soviet Union.

Iachim Grosul died on 28 September 1976, in Chișinău. He was buried in the Central Orthodox Cemetery in Chișinău and there is a gray granite monument with the image of the academician carved in the haut-relief technique, made by the sculptor Lazar Dubinovschi.

In 2004, his image and name were used on a silver coin minted by Central Bank of Transnistria to honor this native of what today is Transnistria, as part of a series of memorable coins called "The Outstanding People of Pridnestrovie".

Notes

References
Brezianu, Andrei and Spânu, Vlad (eds.) (2007) "Grosul, Iachim (1912–1976)" Historical Dictionary of Moldova (2nd ed.) Scarecrow Press, Lanham, Maryland, USA, p. 171, 

1912 births
1976 deaths
People from Slobozia District
Corresponding Members of the USSR Academy of Sciences
Members of the Supreme Soviet of the Moldavian Soviet Socialist Republic
Academic staff of Moldova State University
Fifth convocation members of the Supreme Soviet of the Soviet Union
Sixth convocation members of the Supreme Soviet of the Soviet Union
Eighth convocation members of the Supreme Soviet of the Soviet Union
Ninth convocation members of the Supreme Soviet of the Soviet Union
Recipients of the Order of Friendship of Peoples
Recipients of the Order of Lenin
Recipients of the Order of the Red Banner of Labour
Historians of Russia
Economic historians
Soviet historians